Gurugram University is a state university established by Haryana Act 17 of 2017 and started functioning from academic year 2018–19.

Faculties and departments 
The university has the following faculties and departments:

Faculty of Commerce and Management 
 Department of Management
 Department of Commerce

Faculty of Science and Technology 
 Department of Engineering Technology
 Department of Chemistry
 Department of Physics
 Department of Mathematics

Faculty of Law and Humanities 
 Department of Law
 Department of Hindi
 Department of English
 Department of Media Studies

Faculty of Life Sciences 
 Department of Physiotherapy
 Department of Neurosciences
 Department of Public Health
 Department of Pharmaceutical Sciences

Faculty of Social Sciences and Education 
 Department of Public Policy, Administration and Governance

 Department of Psychology
 Department of Public Administration
 Department of Education
 Department of M.A.(Political Science)
 Department of Economics

References

External links 
 

 

Gurgaon
Universities in Haryana
2017 establishments in India
Educational institutions established in 2017